The Chinese Elm cultivar Ulmus parvifolia 'King's Choice' is one of the early American selections best known for its winter hardiness, able to withstand temperatures of -30 deg. Celsius. 'King's Choice' was patented in 1985.

Description
Bushy in shape, its leaves turn yellow in autumn, but the cultivar lacks the attractive mottled bark for which the species is renowned.

Pests and diseases
The species and its cultivars are highly resistant, but not immune, to Dutch elm disease, and unaffected by the Elm Leaf Beetle Xanthogaleruca luteola.

Cultivation
The tree featured in the elm trials  conducted by Northern Arizona University at Holbrook, eastern Arizona. 'King's Choice' is not known to be in cultivation in Europe or Australasia.

Etymology
The tree was named for Benjamin J. King, who made the original selection at King's Men Tree Farms, Hampstead, Maryland.

Accessions

North America

Arnold Arboretum, US. Acc. no. 287-95
Holden Arboretum, US. Acc. no. 92-94

References

Chinese elm cultivar
Ulmus articles with images
Ulmus